Audrey MacLean (born 1952) is an American businesswoman and entrepreneur.  She has been featured on Forbes’ Midas Touch List, Fortune’s Most Powerful Women and Business Week’s Top 50 Business Women in America.

Early life and career 
A native of Queens, New York, she attended Long Island University before heading to the West coast and earning a B.S. in mathematics from the University of Redlands.  In the summer of 1982, she left Tymshare and co-founded Network Equipment Technologies.  Later, she  was the founder and CEO of Adaptive Corp., a maker of high-speed switches.

She has provided seed financing to numerous successful start-ups including Pure Software, Pete's Brewing Company, AdForce, StarMaker Interactive and Selectica.  Today, she is an active investor and currently serves on the board or advisory board of almost a dozen other start-ups, including: Aible, Andalou, BeyondCore, Coraid, Finesse, Followanalytics, Loopt, Luxe, mOasis, Queplix, Skybox, SolumTech, and StarMaker.   Working with the new generation of entrepreneurs, she is often called on for her advice.

MacLean is an advisor to Foundation Capital and serves on the faculty at Stanford University's Graduate School of Engineering. 
In May 2011, she received the third Symons Innovator Award given annually by NCWIT to honor successful women entrepreneurs in technology.

References

American businesspeople
Living people
1952 births